Matteo Donegà (born 1 April 1998 in Bondeno) is an Italian cyclist, who currently rides for UCI Continental team .

Major results
Source:
2016
 1st  Omnium, National Junior Track Championships
 2nd  Points race, UEC European Junior Track Championships
 2nd Trofeo Guido Dorigo
 3rd Trofeo Buffoni
2018
 2nd  Points race, UEC European Under-23 Track Championships
 4th Trofeo Piva
2020
 2nd  Points race, UEC European Track Championships

References

External links

1998 births
Living people
Italian male cyclists
Italian track cyclists
Sportspeople from the Province of Ravenna
Cyclists from Emilia-Romagna
21st-century Italian people